"1963" is a track by English rock group New Order. It was originally released as a B-side to "True Faith" in 1987 and appeared on the Substance compilation of the same year. It was then released as a single in January 1995, in a radio mix by Arthur Baker.

"1963"'s B-sides are all remixes of the title track or songs previously released.

Lyrics
In New Order Music 1981–89, the band's lyricist Bernard Sumner writes a tongue-in-cheek account of the song's lyrics that relate it to the 1963 assassination of John F. Kennedy. Sumner facetiously theorises that Kennedy arranged for Lee Harvey Oswald to shoot his wife so that "J.F. could do one with M. Monroe".  Monroe commits suicide when Oswald hits the wrong target (in reality, Marilyn Monroe died in 1962, over a year before the assassination took place) and Oswald is later shot by his boss (implied to be Jack Ruby), for "doing such a bad job and causing his hit-man business to go bust."

The producer Stephen Hague has referred to the song as "the only song about domestic violence that you can dance to."

Versions
The original 1987 version ended in a fade-out while repeating the last line of the outro, "I will always feel free". The "94 album mix", also included on the international edition of (The Best of) New Order as "1963-94", had all new orchestration and is similar in structure to the original version, except that the outro is removed and replaced with a repeat of the final bridge and chorus, faded out. The 1995 Arthur Baker remix restores the original outro, and, instead of fading out, has a cold ending after four repeats of the last line.

An extended mix of "1963-94" appeared on the 2005 Singles compilation, while the 2016 re-release of Singles features the Arthur Baker remix.

Music video
The video for the single's release, featuring the "95 Arthur Baker Radio remix", was directed by Gina Birch and produced by Michael H. Shamberg. It depicts British comic actress Jane Horrocks waking up in a box in the countryside and walking to the city. Jane's suitcase becomes bigger in each camera take, eventually growing to the size of the box she initially emerged from before she climbs inside.

Track listing

Charts

References

See also
 John F. Kennedy assassination conspiracy theories

New Order (band) songs
1995 singles
1987 songs
Songs about Marilyn Monroe
Songs about the assassination of John F. Kennedy
Cultural depictions of Jacqueline Kennedy Onassis
Cultural depictions of Lee Harvey Oswald
Songs written by Bernard Sumner
Songs written by Peter Hook
Songs written by Stephen Morris (musician)
Songs written by Gillian Gilbert
Songs written by Stephen Hague
Song recordings produced by Stephen Hague
Factory Records singles
London Records singles